Cry Wolf is the first album by glam rock band Cry Wolf. It was released only in Japan.

Track listing
"West Wind Blows"
"It Ain't Enough"
"Pretender"
"I Am the Walrus" (Beatles cover)
"Red Shoes"
"Stop, Look & Listen"
"Face Down in the Wishing Well"
"Wings"
"Long Hard Road"
"Back to You"

1989 debut albums
Cry Wolf (band) albums